Yukiko Sugawara is a Japanese pianist born in Sapporo.

Life 
She first studied piano with Aiko Iguchi at the Toho Gakuen School of Music in Tokyo. She continued her studies in Germany with Hans-Erich Riebensahm in Berlin and Aloys Kontarsky in Cologne. Sugawara has been awarded the Kranichstein Prize.

Sugawara is married to German composer Helmut Lachenmann.

As a soloist, she has played with Pierre Boulez, Péter Eötvös, Michael Gielen, Hans Zender, Sylvain Cambreling and Lothar Zagrosek. Many composers have written works for her.

Sugawara is a chamber musician who has played with the Ensemble Recherche as well as in duet with violinist Asako Urushihara.

She has also played with Christian Dierstein and Marcus Weiss.

She also plays in the rest of the world, notably in Chicago, New York, Tokyo, Kyoto and also in the Akiyoshidai Quasi-National Park.

Ensembles 
Along with Marcus Weiss, Sugawara founded Trio Accanto in 1994.

Works 
Among her many CD productions are recordings of works by Helmut Lachenmann and Mark Andre.

She also records for three important labels: "Wergo", "Col Legno" and "Kairos".

References

External links 
  Yukiko Sugawara on Edition Zeitklang 
 Discography on Discogs
 Helmut Lachenmann - Serynade (1998) für Klavier (YouTube)

Japanese classical pianists
Women classical pianists
People from Sapporo
Year of birth missing (living people)
Living people